Killara railway station is located on the North Shore line, serving the Sydney suburb of Killara. It is served by Sydney Trains T1 North Shore line services. Killara Railway Station has heritage significance at a local level and is set among expansive gardens, rare in the Sydney Metropolitan train network.

History
Killara station opened on 10 July 1899. The present island platform and station building were completed in 1906 in anticipation of the line being doubled. This occurred in 1909.

Platforms and services

Transport links
Killara station is served indirectly by one NightRide route that stops on the Pacific Highway:
N90: Hornsby station to Town Hall station

References

External links

Killara station details Transport for New South Wales

Railway stations in Sydney
Railway stations in Australia opened in 1899
North Shore railway line
Killara, New South Wales